Wife Bina Life (English: Life without Wife) is the Indian version of the British reality show The Week the Women Went. It premiered on STAR Plus on 29 January 2011 and aired Saturday and Sunday evenings.

The show is based on 10 families. The husbands have to take all the responsibilities to run home without their wives. They have to look after their kids also while the wives will go on the luxurious vacation for 6 weeks. The show is judged by the wives. It is located in Pune.

It was hosted by Cyrus Sahukar and Mini Mathur.

References

External links
 Wife Bina Life on STAR Plus Official Website

Indian reality television series
StarPlus original programming